Victoria Rodríguez may refer to:

 Victoria Rodríguez (tennis) (born 1995), Mexican tennis player
 Victoria Rodríguez (actress) (1931–2020), Spanish actress
 Victoria Rodríguez (television presenter) (born 1972), Uruguayan actress and television presenter
 Victoria Rodriguez Lopez (born 1991), Argentine speed skater